A list of American films released in 1942.

Bob Hope hosted the 15th Academy Awards ceremony at the Ambassador Hotel in Los Angeles. The winner of the Outstanding Motion Picture (later: Best Picture) category was MGM's Mrs. Miniver.

The other nine nominated pictures were 49th Parallel; Kings Row; The Magnificent Ambersons; The Pied Piper; The Pride of the Yankees; Random Harvest; The Talk of the Town; Wake Island; and Yankee Doodle Dandy.

Casablanca was released in 1942, but won its three Oscars in 1944.

A-B

C-D

E-F

G-H

I-J

K-L

M-N

O-P

Q-R

S

T

U-V

W-Z

Documentaries

Serials

Shorts

See also
 1942 in the United States

References

External links

1942 films at the Internet Movie Database

1942
Films
Lists of 1942 films by country or language